is a Japanese term for an online avatar depicting an anime-style female character used by content creators who are often (but not always) male.

Babiniku may be using an avatar of a cute girl, acting as a virtual girl in a virtual space such as VRChat, or acting as a virtual YouTuber or virtual idol. They may modify their voice into a girl's voice by using a voice changer, or they may simply use their natural voice along with the female 3D model, Live2D model, or static picture.

Origin 
The word "incarnation" originated from what Nijisanji VTuber  said about getting a 3D model of herself.

The "soul" and the "body" is generally the same in the virtual YouTuber community, but the VTuber known as "Virtual -loli  YouTuber " ("virtual -lolita fox girl YouTuber guy",) became popular at the end of 2017, and she is a male using a female nikutai. She announced she was a male using a female avatar, showing he could become a cute girl character even if he was a man and his voice was still his natural male voice. Many VTubers and Babiniku VTubers became active after seeing her videos. Her work resulted in an acceptance from viewers, as they didn't care if there was a man behind a character so long as the character itself was cute.

For some, babiniku is not just about seeing a cute character, but also about finding entertainment in the mismatch between the soul (performer) and the gender presented, which can be considered part of the VTuber's content. One difference between a normal VTubers and a babiniku VTuber is that many babiniku VTubers acknowledge the existence of the person behind the character. The difference between a nekama and a babiniku is that a babiniku often acknowledges the gender difference between the user and how they present themselves.

At the end of May 2018, however, cartoonist  and illustrator  introduced a method of animating illustrations during live streams by using software called FaceRig and Live2D. This quickly became popular among illustrators. Many VTubers were originally illustrators, which helped the development of a community of those VTubers who made it publicly known that their "soul" was male. In June 2018, there was a live stream titled "Virtual  Self  One Night " ("Virtual-Girl-Self-Incarnation-Guys Girls' Party, playing One Night Werewolf"), and this title was the source of the term babiniku.

"Hell" 

"Hellish" is a word often used to indirectly describe babiniku. Rimukoro, Maki-hitsuji, Magurona, and Natori Sana were all asked in interviews, "what is babiniku?", to which they all responded, "it's hell". They provided a variety of reasons why they thought so, including that it "twists your nature" or "has a deep darkness".

According to Magurona, she made the title "Virtual-Girl-Self-Incarnation-Guys Girls' Party" for the livestream because it was originally meant to be "hellish content where guys who have drawn their own avatars and transformed themselves into cute girls get together and make some noise". Over time, the "self" aspect of Magurona's title—which indicated the performers created their avatars themselves—faded away, and the term babiniku could be applied to any man acting through an avatar depicting a cute girl, regardless of how he obtained the avatar. Magurona's performer has no desire to become more feminine himself.

Vocalization 
It is difficult to convert an ordinary male voice into a female voice through instrumental manipulation alone. It is important that the performer bring their voice closer to a feminine voice by using their falsetto or a mixed voice as the smaller the change in pitch and formant in the voice changer, the more natural the female voice will be. There are also some babiniku VTubers, such as Takehana Nohto, who speak in female-like voices without using a voice changer. The voice itself is not the only factor in achieving a feminine voice, speech patterns and intonation are important as well.

In television 
On 8 January 2020, NHK Educational TV broadcast about Babiniku in "Nehorin-Pahorin".

Popular Babiniku VTubers

With voice changer 
  ("Magurona the Demon King") or simply "Magurona"
 Her performer is a male illustrator (ukyo_rst). She is regarded as a leading figure among the babiniku performers.
 
 Her performer is a male illustrator. Her 3D model was created by Han-sode.
 
 Her 3D model was made by Han-sode, the same artist that created Tomari Mari's avatar.
 
 Her performer is a male illustrator named Umika Tamano.
 
 Her 3D model was made by Han-sode, the same artist that created Tomari Mari's avatar.
 
 Her performer is a novelist, video game writer and graphic designer named . One well-known project he worked on was Remake Our Life!.
 
 Her performer is a male cartoonist. One well-known project he worked on was No Game No Life.
 
 Her performer is a female cartoonist. One well-known project she worked on was Anenarumono. She uses the voice changer Babi-goe. She is considered a babiniku because she is a VTuber who created her own avatar, not because she is a male VTuber using a female avatar.

Without voice changer 
  Note
 Her performer is a male illustrator who worked on The Hidden Dungeon Only I Can Enter.
 Fairys
 Her performer is a man using a feminine voice. Her character design is made by Yuzuriha, so she is not the type of babiniku who created their own female incarnation.
 ("Rimu and Maki")
 
 Her performer is a male cartoonist. One well-known project he worked on was The Helpful Fox Senko-san.
 
 Her performer is a male illustrator who worked on Azur Lane. 
 
 Her performer is a male designer.
 
 Her performer is a male illustrator. He drew the avatar for Ogino Minori, who is a virtual YouTuber and Ōta ward assemblyman (Ogino Minoru).

References

Annotations

Citations 

VTubers
Abbreviations
Japanese words and phrases
Japanese popular culture